Patrick Maurice Power  (born 6 June 1947) is a New Zealand tenor. He has sung nearly all the lyric tenor repertoire in most of the major opera companies and festivals in Europe and North America. He was educated at St. Patrick's College, Silverstream, University of Otago, University of Auckland, Auckland Teachers' College, L'Università per Stranieri, Perugia, and the University of Waikato. He earned a three-year contract with the Norwegian National Opera in 1976.

He has performed Pagliacci and Cavalleria rusticana in Auckland, and featured in an episode of the television series Coming Home in 1999.

He is currently lecturing in voice, languages for singers and vocal pedagogy at the Elder Conservatorium of Music, University of Adelaide.

In the 2003 Queen's Birthday Honours, Power was appointed an Officer of the New Zealand Order of Merit, for services to opera.

See also
 Monteverdi: Il ritorno d'Ulisse in patria (Raymond Leppard recording)

References

External links
 Patrick Power
 Patrick Power.pdf
 Coming home

1947 births
Living people
New Zealand operatic tenors
Officers of the New Zealand Order of Merit
20th-century New Zealand male opera singers
People educated at St. Patrick's College, Silverstream
University of Otago alumni
University of Auckland alumni
University of Waikato alumni